Columbus is an unincorporated community in Johnson County, in the U.S. state of Missouri.

The community is on Missouri Route M approximately 2.5 miles north of US Route 50. Warrensburg is ten miles to the southeast. The North Fork of the Blackwater River flows past one half mile to the southwest.

History
The county seat was once located at Columbus. The town site was platted in 1836. A post office called Columbus was in operation from 1837 until 1920. The community was named for Christopher Columbus.

References

Unincorporated communities in Johnson County, Missouri
Populated places in Johnson County, Missouri
Unincorporated communities in Missouri